The South Asian Regional Trade Union Council (SARTUC) is a federation of national trade union centers whose geographic scope covers South Asia. SARTUC's mission is to promote workers' rights within its member nations.

History
The South Asian Regional Trade Union Council was formed in January 1988 by some of the affiliates of the International Confederation of Free Trade Unions (now the ITUC) in countries belonging to the South Asian Association for Regional Cooperation (SAARC)—Afghanistan, Bangladesh, Bhutan, India, Maldives, Nepal, Pakistan and Sri Lanka. The Indian trade union center Indian National Trade Union Congress and Hind Mazdoor Sabha, were the founding members of SARTUC.

Nazrul Islam Khan (then-president of the Bangladesh Metal Workers' Federation) was SAR-TUC's general-secretary in 2003.

Leadership

General Secretaries
1988: Jamshedpur Gopeshwar
1998: Nazrul Islam Khan
Laxman Basnet

Presidents
1988: Savumiamoorthy Thondaman

G. Sanjeeva Reddy

References

Labor relations
Organizations established in 1988
International organizations based in Asia
Trade Union Council
Labour in Afghanistan
Labour in Bangladesh
Labour in Bhutan
Labour in India
Labour in the Maldives
Labour in Nepal
Labour in Pakistan
Labour in Sri Lanka